Minkhaung of Prome (died 1553) was the last king of Prome, who reigned three tumultuous years from 1539 to 1542. He succeeded his brother Narapati in 1539. Minkhaung frantically prepared to defend against another attack by Toungoo Kingdom. He reinforced his already heavily fortified city of Prome (Pyay), and hired foreign mercenaries. Although he knew his nominal overlords, the Confederation of Shan States, would assist him, he continued the alliance with King Min Bin of Mrauk U begun by his late brother. Min Bin was married to Minkhaung's and Narapati's sister.

In late 1541, Toungoo again laid siege to Prome. Prome's allies the Confederation and Mrauk U sent in help to break the siege. But Toungoo forces under the command of Gen. Bayinnaung defeated both armies. Mrauk U also sent in a naval flotilla that landed in Bassein (Pathein). Upon hearing of the Mrauk U army's defeat, the flotilla turned back. After a five months' siege, starvation set in. The besieged deserted the city in great numbers. On 19 May 1542 (5th waxing of Nayon 904 ME), Minkhaung surrendered. Minkhaung and his queen Thiri Hpone Htut were taken to Toungoo (Taungoo).

King Tabinshwehti of Toungoo appointed Mingyi Swe, Bayinnaung's father, governor of Prome, restoring its former position of a provincial capital.

Minkhaung remained under house arrest until 1553 when he was executed by Bayinnaung. Thiri Hpone Htut became a queen of Bayinnaung with the title of Sanda Dewi.

Ancestry
The following is his ancestry as reported in the Hmannan Yazawin chronicle, which in turn referenced contemporary inscriptions.

Notes

References

Bibliography
 
 
 

1553 deaths
Year of birth unknown
Prome dynasty
16th-century Burmese monarchs